Aerial telegraphy may refer to:

 Wigwag (flag signals), signalling by hand with a single flag
 Optical telegraphy, chains of fixed telegraph stations using shutters or semaphore arms
 Wireless telegraphy in general, or from an aircraft in particular